The 2017 TCU Horned Frogs baseball team represented Texas Christian University during the 2017 NCAA Division I baseball season. The Horned Frogs played their home games at Charlie & Marie Lupton Baseball Stadium as a member of the Big 12 Conference. They were led by head coach Jim Schlossnagle, the winningest coach in TCU baseball history, in his 14th year at TCU.

Previous season
The Horned Frogs entered the 2017 season on the heels of three consecutive trips to the College World Series. The 2016 TCU Horned Frogs baseball team notched a 38–14 (15–9) regular season record to finish third in the Big 12 Conference standings. In the postseason, the Horned Frogs won the Big 12 Tournament Championship with wins over Baylor, Oklahoma State, Texas and West Virginia, were selected as one of sixteen NCAA Regional Tournament hosts for the third year in a row and the sixth time in eight years, swept through the Fort Worth Regional with wins over Oral Roberts, Gonzaga and Arizona State; advanced to the Super Regional round of the Tournament for the third straight year, where they faced #4 National Seed Texas A&M in College Station, TX for the best-of-three series; won the College Station Super Regional after an 8–2 win, 1–7 loss and 4–1 win; and advanced to their third consecutive College World Series.  At the 2016 CWS, the Frogs notched a 2–2 record, winning their first two games over Texas Tech and Coastal Carolina before losing two consecutive games to Coastal Carolina and being eliminated from the tournament.  TCU finished the season with a 49–18 record and ranked third in the final polls.

Preseason

MLB draft
The following Horned Frogs on the 2016 roster were selected in the 2016 Major League Baseball draft:

* indicates draftee had no more college eligibility

Departed players
The following Horned Frogs on the 2016 roster departed the program prior to the 2017 season:

Summer leagues
Between the 2015–16 and 2016–17 academic years, the following 2017 Horned Frogs participated in summer collegiate baseball leagues:

Recruiting class
The Horned Frogs added the following 11 players to the roster as part of their 2016 recruiting class:

Season projections
Coming off three straight College World Series appearances in 2014, 2015 and 2016, losing only four players to graduation and the Draft, and adding a highly ranked recruiting class, the 2017 Horned Frogs were projected as one of the "Eight for Omaha" in July 2016 by Baseball America, D1 Baseball and Perfect Game.

The Horned Frogs started the 2017 season as the unanimous preseason #1 club.  For the third straight year, TCU was picked to finish first in the Big 12 Conference.

Personnel

Coaching staff
TCU returns its entire coaching staff from the Frogs' 2014, 2015 and 2016 College World Series seasons. After leading the Frogs to their third consecutive College World Series and being named Baseball America's 2016 National Coach of the Year, Jim Schlossnagle, the winningest coach in TCU Horned Frogs baseball history, inked a six-year contract extension worth over $1 million per year, and assistants Shane Mosiello and Kirk Saarloos inked multi-year contract extensions.

Roster

Schedule and results

! style="background:#4d1979;color:white;"| Regular Season
|- valign="top" 

|- bgcolor="#bbffbb"
| February 17 || 6:30 pm || || * || #1 || Lupton Stadium • Fort Worth, TX || W6–3 || Janczak(1–0) || Biasi(0–1) || Feltman(1) || 5,812 || 1–0 || – || StatsStory
|- bgcolor="#bbffbb"
| February 18 || 2:00 pm || || Penn State* || #1 || Lupton Stadium • Fort Worth, TX || W12–1 || Howard(1–0) || Lehman(0–1) || – || 5,507 || 2–0 || – || StatsStory
|- bgcolor="#bbffbb"
| February 19 || 11:00 am || FSSW+ || Penn State* || #1 || Lupton Stadium • Fort Worth, TX || W9–3 || Lodolo(1–0) || Hagenman(0–1) || – || 4,455 || 3–0 || – || StatsStory
|- bgcolor="#bbffbb"
| February 21 || 6:30 pm || || at UT Arlington* || #1 || Clay Gould Ballpark • Arlington, TX || W7–2 || Eissler(1–0) || West(0–1) || – || 2,008 || 4–0 || – || StatsStory
|- bgcolor="#ffbbbb"
| February 24 || 6:30 pm || || #19 * || #1 || Lupton Stadium • Fort Worth, TX || L9–13 || Lingos(2–0) || Howard(1–1) || – || 5,062 || 4–1 || – || StatsStory
|- bgcolor="#bbffbb"
| February 25 || 4:00 pm || || #19 Arizona State* || #1 || Lupton Stadium • Fort Worth, TX || W8–4 || Lodolo(2–0) || Hingst(0–1) || Wymer(1) || 5,153 || 5–1 || – || StatsStory
|- bgcolor="#bbffbb"
| February 26 || 1:00 pm || FSSW+ || #19 Arizona State* || #1 || Lupton Stadium • Fort Worth, TX || W5–2 || Janczak(2–0) || Montoya(0–1) || Feltman(2) || 4,481 || 6–1 || – || StatsStory
|- bgcolor="#bbffbb"
| February 28 || 6:30 pm || || * || #1 || Lupton Stadium • Fort Worth, TX || W13–5 || Eissler(2–0) || Amador(0–2) || – || 4,205 || 7–1 || – || StatsStory
|-

|- bgcolor="#bbffbb"
| March 3 || 7:05 pm || FS2 || #3 LSU* || #1 || Minute Maid Park • Houston, TX(Shriners Hospitals for Children College Classic) || W9–6 || Howard(2–1) || Lange(2–1) || King(1) || 17,145 || 8–1 || – || StatsStory
|- bgcolor="#bbffbb"
| March 4 || 7:05 pm || FS2 || #11 Texas A&M* || #1 || Minute Maid Park • Houston, TX(Shriners Hospitals for Children College Classic) || W11–1015 || Feltman(1–0) || Chafin(1–1) || – || 21,843 || 9–1 || – || StatsStory
|- bgcolor="#bbffbb"
| March 5 || 1:35 pm || FSN || #9 Ole Miss* || #1 || Minute Maid Park • Houston, TX(Shriners Hospitals for Children College Classic) || W5–3 || Janczak(3–0) || Feigl(1–1) || Feltman(3) || 6,497 || 10–1 || – || StatsStory
|- bgcolor="#bbffbb"
| March 7 || 6:30 pm || || #16 * || #1 || Lupton Stadium • Fort Worth, TX || W3–210 || Feltman(2–0) || Elledge(0–1) || – || 4,600 || 11–1 || – || StatsStory
|- bgcolor="#ffbbbb"
| March 10 || 8:30 pm || || at * || #1 || Anteater Ballpark • Irvine, CA || L2–11 || Raymond(3–1) || Howard(2–2) || – || 1,148 || 11–2 || – || StatsStory
|- bgcolor="#ffbbbb"
| March 11 || 4:00 pm || || at UC Irvine* || #1 || Anteater Ballpark • Irvine, CA || L3–6 || Spear(2–0) || Lodolo(2–1) || Faucher(6) || 1,168 || 11–3 || – || StatsStory
|- bgcolor="#bbffbb"
| March 12 || 3:00 pm || || at UC Irvine* || #1 || Anteater Ballpark • Irvine, CA || W16–7 || Janczak(4–0) || Martin(1–1) || – || 1,394 || 12–3 || – || StatsStory
|- bgcolor="#ffbbbb"
| March 14 || 8:00 pm || || at * || #3 || Blair Field • Long Beach, CA || L0–7 || Villalobos(1–0) || Horton(0–1) || – || 1,732 || 12–4 || – || StatsStory
|- bgcolor="#bbffbb"
| March 17 || 6:30 pm || ||  || #3 || Lupton Stadium • Fort Worth, TX || W3–1 || Wymer(1–0) || Leban(0–1) || Feltman(4) || 4,521 || 13–4 || 1–0 || StatsStory
|- bgcolor="#bbffbb"
| March 18 || 5:00 pm || FSSW || Kansas || #3 || Lupton Stadium • Fort Worth, TX || W5–1 || Janczak(5–0) || Turski(1–2) || – || 4,904 || 14–4 || 2–0 || StatsStory
|- bgcolor="#ffbbbb"
| March 19 || 1:00 pm || FSSW+ || Kansas || #3 || Lupton Stadium • Fort Worth, TX || L3–4 || Villines(1–2) || Wymer(1–1) || – || 4,535 || 14–5 || 2–1 || StatsStory
|- bgcolor="#bbffbb"
| March 21 || 6:30 pm || || at **(Game completed May 2 in Fort Worth) || #3 || Crutcher Scott Field • Abilene, TX || W3–0 || Eissler(3–0)* || Skeffington(1–4)* || Feltman(11)* || 1,432 || 33–11* || – || StatsStory
|- bgcolor="#bbffbb"
| March 24 || 6:30 pm || ||  || #3 || Lupton Stadium • Fort Worth, TX || W7–5 || Green(1–0) || Teel(2–2) || Feltman(5) || 4,794 || 15–5 || 3–1 || StatsStory
|- bgcolor="#bbffbb"
| March 25 || 7:00 pm || ESPN2 || Oklahoma State || #3 || Lupton Stadium • Fort Worth, TX || W6–5 || Morris(1–0) || Hearrean(0–1) || Feltman(6) || 5,502 || 16–5 || 4–1 || StatsStory
|- bgcolor="#bbffbb"
| March 26 || 1:00 pm || ESPN2 || Oklahoma State || #3 || Lupton Stadium • Fort Worth, TX || W5–1 || Howard(3–2) || Battenfield(2–1) || Eissler(1) || 4,745 || 17–5 || 5–1 || StatsStory
|- bgcolor="#bbffbb"
| March 28 || 6:30 pm || || * || #3 || Lupton Stadium • Fort Worth, TX || W10–2 || Eissler(3–0) || Martinez(2–1) || – || 3,760 || 18–5 || – || StatsStory
|- bgcolor="#bbffbb"
| March 29 || 6:30 pm || || UTRGV* || #3 || Lupton Stadium • Fort Worth, TX || W18–27 || Boyles(1–0) || Delgado(2–2) || – || 3,854 || 19–5 || – || StatsStory
|- bgcolor="#bbffbb"
| March 31 || 6:35 pm || ESPN3 || at  || #3 || Tointon Family Stadium • Manhattan, KS || W5–011 || Wymer(2–1) || Floyd(1–3) || – || 1,872 || 20–5 || 6–1 || StatsStory
|-

|- bgcolor="#bbffbb"
| April 1 || 2:05 pm || ESPN3 || at  || #3 || Tointon Family Stadium • Manhattan, KS || W1–010 || Green(2–0) || Ward(0–2) || Feltman(7) || 2,060 || 21–5 || 7–1 || StatsStory
|- bgcolor="#bbffbb"
| April 2 || 1:05 pm || ESPN3 || at Kansas State || #3 || Tointon Family Stadium • Manhattan, KS || W12–4 || Howard(4–2) || Heinen(1–2) || – || 1,836 || 22–5 || 8–1 || StatsStory
|- bgcolor="#bbffbb"
| April 4 || 6:30 pm || || at UT Arlington* || #3 || Clay Gould Ballpark • Arlington, TX || W5–4 || Traver(1–0) || West(0–2) || Feltman(8) || 1,187 || 23–5 || – || StatsStory
|- bgcolor="#bbffbb"
| April 7 || 6:30 pm || || * || #3 || Lupton Stadium • Fort Worth, TX || W9–2 || Janczak(6–0) || Dills(2–1) || – || 5,024 || 24–5 || – || StatsStory
|- bgcolor="#bbffbb"
| April 8 || 2:00 pm || FSSW || Murray State* || #3 || Lupton Stadium • Fort Worth, TX || W15–6 || Lodolo(3–1) || Dubsky(2–4) || – || 4,780 || 25–5 || – || StatsStory
|- bgcolor="#bbffbb"
| April 9 || 1:00 pm || || Murray State* || #3 || Lupton Stadium • Fort Worth, TX || W13–27 || Howard(5–2) || Hranec(2–2) || – || 4,733 || 26–5 || – || StatsStory
|- bgcolor="#bbffbb"
| April 11 || 6:30 pm || || at * || #2 || Horner Ballpark • Dallas, TX || W9–3 || Traver(2–0) || Johnson(0–2) || – || 1,245 || 27–5 || – || StatsStory
|- bgcolor="#ffbbbb"
| April 14 || 5:30 pm || || at West Virginia || #2 || Monongalia County Ballpark • Granville, WV || L4–5 || Zarbnisky(4–0) || Wymer(2–2 || – || 2,914 || 27–6 || 8–2 || StatsStory
|- bgcolor="#bbffbb"
| April 15 || 2:00 pm|| || at West Virginia || #2 || Monongalia County Ballpark • Granville, WV || W8–6 || Boyles(2–0) || McDonald(1–2) || Feltman(9) || 3,415 || 28–6 || 9–2 || StatsStory
|- bgcolor="#ffbbbb"
| April 16 || 11:00 am || || at West Virginia || #2 || Monongalia County Ballpark • Granville, WV || L4–5 || Sigman(1–2) || Feltman(2–1) || – || 1,103 || 28–7 || 9–3 || StatsStory
|- bgcolor="#bbffbb"
| April 21 || 6:30 pm || FCS ||  || #3 || Lupton Stadium • Fort Worth, TX || W9–4 || Lodolo(4–1) || Lewis(4–4) || – || 4,885 || 29–7 || 10–3 ||StatsStory
|- bgcolor="#ffbbbb"
| April 22 || 3:00 pm || FSSW || Baylor || #3 || Lupton Stadium • Fort Worth, TX || L5–16 || Parsons(3–2) || Traver(2–1) || – || 5,287 || 29–8 || 10–4 || StatsStory
|- bgcolor="#bbffbb"
| April 23 || 1:00 pm || || Baylor || #3 || Lupton Stadium • Fort Worth, TX || W8–5 || Howard(6–2) || Bradford(4–3) || Brown (1) || 5,227 || 30–8 || 11–4 || StatsStory
|- bgcolor="#ffbbbb"
| April 25 || 6:30 pm || FSSW+ || * || #2 || Lupton Stadium • Fort Worth, TX || L2–6 || Nouis(2–2) || King(0–1) || – || 4,129 || 30–9 || – || StatsStory
|- bgcolor="#bbffbb"
| April 28 || 6:30 pm || FS1 || at #6 Texas Tech || #2 || Dan Law Field at Rip Griffin Park • Lubbock, TX || W4–1 || Lodolo(5–1) || Lanning(2–1) || Feltman(10) || 4,432 || 31–9 || 12–4 || StatsStory
|- bgcolor="#ffbbbb"
| April 29 || 3:00 pm || ESPNU || at #6 Texas Tech || #2 || Dan Law Field at Rip Griffin Park • Lubbock, TX || L4–6 || Kilian(4–0) || King(0–2) || Mushinski(2) || 4,432 || 31–10 || 12–5 || StatsStory
|- bgcolor="#ffbbbb"
| April 30 || 1:30 pm || ESPN || at #6 Texas Tech || #2 || Dan Law Field at Rip Griffin Park • Lubbock, TX || L3–21 || Shetter(3–0) || Howard(6–3) || – || 4,432 || 31–11 || 12–6 || StatsStory
|-

|- bgcolor="#bbffbb"
| May 5 || 7:00 pm || ESPNU || Texas || #8 || Lupton Stadium • Fort Worth, TX || W11–1011 || Coughlin(1–0) || Ridgeway(1–2) || – || 5,078 || 33–11 || 13–6 || StatsStory
|- bgcolor="#bbffbb"
| May 6 || 12:00 pm || ESPN2 || Texas || #8 || Lupton Stadium • Fort Worth, TX || W8–2 || Howard(7–3) || Kingham(7–4) || – || 5,324 || 34–11 || 14–6 || StatsStory
|- bgcolor="#bbffbb"
| May 7 || 1:00 pm || ESPNU || Texas || #8 || Lupton Stadium • Fort Worth, TX || W4–310 || Wymer(3–2) || Kennedy(7–1) || – || 5,460 || 35–11 || 15–6 || StatsStory
|- bgcolor="#bbffbb"
| May 12 || 6:30 pm || || at  || #4 || L. Dale Mitchell Baseball Park • Norman, OK || W9–6 || Wymer(4–2) || Olson(3–1) || Feltman(12) || 1,507 || 36–11 || 16–6 || StatsStory
|- bgcolor="#ffbbbb"
| May 13 || 2:00 pm || FSN || at Oklahoma || #4 || L. Dale Mitchell Baseball Park • Norman, OK || L8–9 || Olsen(4–1) || Feltman(2–2) || – || 1,607 || 36–12 || 16–7 || StatsStory
|- bgcolor="#ffbbbb"
| May 14 || 1:00 pm || FSN || at Oklahoma || #4 || L. Dale Mitchell Baseball Park • Norman, OK || L9–10 || Olsen(5–1) || Wymer(4–3) || – || 1,379 || 36–13 || 16–8 || StatsStory
|- bgcolor="#bbffbb"
| May 16 || 6:30 pm || FSSW+ || UT Arlington* || #6 || Lupton Stadium • Fort Worth, TX || W6–1 || Morris(2–0) || Vassar(3–2) || – || 4,376 || 37–13 || 16–8 || StatsStory
|- bgcolor="#bbffbb"
| May 18 || 9:05 pm || || at * || #6 || Evans Diamond • Berkeley, CA || W3–0 || Janczak(7–0) || Matulovich(4–3) || Feltman(13) || 568 || 38–13 || – || StatsStory
|- bgcolor="#bbffbb"
| May 19 || 8:05 pm || P12N || at California* || #6 || Evans Diamond • Berkeley, CA || W5–4 || Howard(8–3) || Martinez(4–4) || Feltman(14) || 885 || 39–13 || – || StatsStory
|- bgcolor="#ffbbbb"
| May 20 || 3:05 pm || P12N || at California* || #6 || Evans Diamond • Berkeley, CA || L3–8 || Dodson(2–5) || King(0–3) || – || 1,169 || 39–14 || – || StatsStory
|-

|- 
! style="background:#4d1979;color:white;"| Postseason
|-

|- bgcolor="#ffbbbb"
| May 24 || 4:00 pm || FSSW+ || (7)  || #7 (2) || Chickasaw Bricktown Ballpark • Oklahoma City, OK || L3–7 || Weiman(5–1) || Wymer(4–4) || – || 4,034 || 39–15 || 0–1 || StatsStory
|- bgcolor="#bbffbb"
| May 25 || 12:30 pm || FSSW+ || (3)  || #7 (2) || Chickasaw Bricktown Ballpark • Oklahoma City, OK || W9–4 || Janczak(8–0) || Irvin(6–2) || – || 3,493 || 40–15 || 1–1 || StatsStory
|- bgcolor="#bbffbb"
| May 26 || 7:00 pm || FSSW+ || (7) Kansas || #7 (2) || Chickasaw Bricktown Ballpark • Oklahoma City, OK || W6–0 || Howard(9–3) || Rockoski(5–6) || – || 5,424 || 41–15 || 2–1 || StatsStory
|- bgcolor="#bbffbb"
| May 27 || 12:30 pm || FSSW+ || (6) Texas || #7 (2) || Chickasaw Bricktown Ballpark • Oklahoma City, OK || W9–2 || Traver(3–1) || Johnston(3–2) || – || 5,598 || 42–15 || 3–1 || StatsStory
|- bgcolor="#ffbbbb"
| May 27 || 6:00 pm || FSSW+ || (6) Texas || #7 (2) || Chickasaw Bricktown Ballpark • Oklahoma City, OK || L3–9 || Henley(4–4) || Green(2–1) || – || 3,469 || 42–16 || 3–2 || StatsStory
|-

|- bgcolor="#bbffbb"
| June 3 || 9:45 pm || ESPN3 || (4)  || #8 (1) || Lupton Stadium • Fort Worth, TX || W9–6 || Traver(4–1) || Smith(5–8) || Feltman(16) || 4,151 || 43–16 || 1–0 || StatsStory
|- bgcolor="#bbffbb"
| June 4 || 9:00 pm || ESPN3 || #11 (2)  || #8 (1) || Lupton Stadium • Fort Worth, TX || W5–1 || Janczak(9–0) || Lynch(7–5) || Feltman(17) || 4,133 || 44–16 || 2–0 || StatsStory
|- bgcolor="#bbffbb"
| June 5 || 7:20 pm || ESPN3 || #20 (3)  || #8 (1) || Lupton Stadium • Fort Worth, TX || W15–3 || Howard(10–3) || Fritz(0–1) || – || 4,172 || 45–16 || 3–0 || StatsStory
|-

|- bgcolor="#bbffbb"
| June 10 || 5:00 pm || ESPNU || #8  || #5 || Lupton Stadium • Fort Worth, TX || W3–2 || Wymer(5–4) || Knutson(8–4) || Feltman(18) || 5,181 || 46–16 || 1–0 || StatsStory
|- bgcolor="#bbffbb"
| June 11 || 5:00 pm || ESPNU || #8 Missouri State || #5 || Lupton Stadium • Fort Worth, TX || W8–1 || Howard(11–3) || Still(8–3) || – || 5,277 || 47–16 || 2–0 || StatsStory
|-

|- bgcolor="#ffbbbb"
| June 18 || 6:00 pm || ESPN2 || #3 Florida || #5 || TD Ameritrade Park • Omaha, NE || L0–3 || Faedo(8–2) || Janczak(9–1) || – || 23,543 || 47–17 || 5–1 || 0–1 || StatsStory
|- bgcolor="#bbffbb"
| June 20 || 1:00 pm || ESPN || #8 Texas A&M || #5 || TD Ameritrade Park • Omaha, NE || W4–1 || Howard(12–3) || Kolek(4–5) || Wymer(2) || 17,940  || 48–17 || 6–1 || 1–1 || StatsStory
|- bgcolor="#bbffbb"
| June 22 || 7:00 pm || ESPN2 || #4 Louisville || #5 || TD Ameritrade Park • Omaha, NE || W4–3 || Wymer(6–4) || Bennett(5–1) || – || 24,985 || 49–17 || 7–1 || 2–1 || StatsStory
|- bgcolor="#bbffbb"
| June 23 || 7:00 pm || ESPN || #3 Florida || #5 || TD Ameritrade Park • Omaha, NE || W9–2 || King(1–3) || Kowar(12–1) || – || 25,329 || 50–17 || 8–1 || 3–1 || StatsStory
|- bgcolor="#ffbbbb"
| June 24|| 7:00 pm || ESPN || #3 Florida || #5 || TD Ameritrade Park • Omaha, NE || L0–3 || Faedo(9–2) || Janczak(9–2) || – || 18,093 || 50–18 || 8–2 || 3–2 || StatsStory
|-

| style="font-size:88%" | Legend:       = Win       = Loss      Bold = TCU team member
|-
| style="font-size:88%" | "#" represents ranking. All rankings from Collegiate Baseball on the date of the contest."()" represents postseason seeding in the Big 12 Tournament or NCAA Regional, respectively.

Rankings
 
The Horned Frogs started 2017 as the unanimous preseason #1 club.  On December 20, 2016, TCU was ranked preseason #1 by Collegiate Baseball. The Frogs' were also ranked preseason #1 by Perfect Game on January 11, 2017, D1 Baseball on January 17, 2017, Baseball America on January 23, 2017, the USA Today Coaches Poll on January 26, 2017, and the National Collegiate Baseball Writers Association on January 31, 2017.

Awards and honors

Preseason All Americans

Preseason Big 12 awards

Weekly awards

See also
2017 Big 12 Conference baseball tournament
2017 NCAA Division I baseball season

References

TCU Horned Frogs
TCU Horned Frogs baseball seasons
TCU Horned Frogs baseball
TCU
College World Series seasons